Infection, Genetics and Evolution, Journal of Molecular Epidemiology and Evolutionary Genetics of Infectious Diseases is a peer-reviewed scientific journal established in 2001. It is published by Elsevier. The (founding) editor-in-chief is Michel Tibayrenc. Topics covered include genetics, population genetics, genomics, gene expression, evolutionary biology, population dynamics, mathematical modeling, and bioinformatics.

Abstracting and indexing 
Infection, Genetics and Evolution is abstracted and indexed in:

According to the Journal Citation Reports, the journal has a 2014 impact factor of 3.015.

References

External links 
 

Publications established in 2001
Microbiology journals
Elsevier academic journals
English-language journals